Journey of a Gemini is the fourth studio album by American singer Donell Jones. It was released by LaFace Records on June 20, 2006 in the United States. Pushed back numerous times due to record label complications of the Sony–BMG merger, the album was released to critical acclaim and became Jones' highest charting album on the Billboard Top R&B/Hip-Hop Albums chart where it topped at number one, while entering the top 20 on the Billboard 200 chart. The album was originally scheduled to be released December 20, 2005 under the title Where I Wanna Be: The Last Chapter, the sequel to his studio album Where I Wanna Be (1999), but was finally released in the summer of the following year.

Critical reception

AllMusic editor Andy Kellman rated the album three and a half ouf of five stars. He found that Journey of a Gemini "doesn't quite maintain the steady level of consistency that his first three albums carried, it's nonetheless a satisfying addition to his catalog [...] Since the album's not as ballad-heavy, Jones is less prone to oversinging, and several excellent midtempo tracks — "Better Start Talking," "I'm Gonna Be," "Spend the Night," "Feelin' You," "Lust or Love" — should function equally well in clubs and living rooms. Just to show that he hasn't turned into a total square, there are plenty of nasty bedroom come-ons." Imani A. Dawson from Vibe called the album a "tender mood album that highlights Jones's rich, nuanced vocals" and noted it a "warm and comfortable world."

In his review for Rolling Stone, Peter Relic wrote that he Jones "knows to avoid excessive vocal histrionics and let his slow jams shine, but his switch-ups are hit-and-miss. "Better Start Talking" is a barely serviceable club track featuring Jermaine Dupri, but "If You Want Me," laced with snazzy organ and a PG-rated verse from Bun B, is as good as rapper-crooner collabos get. Then there's "Cry," where, atop a loop of Hall and Oates' "Sara Smile," Jones sheds tears over a preyed-upon girl." Okayplayer found that the album lacked a "narrative structure" and further wrote: "Underlying this loose story is a glossy but bass-heavy 'contemporary' sound that is welcoming if not exactly visionary. Without a doubt, Gemini lacks the sort of visceral punch that made recent albums by Legend, Anthony Hamilton, and Van Hunt so appealing. Nevertheless, Jones provides a solid, if rarely spectacular, collection of songs, compelling as much for their failures as for their successes.

Chart performance
Journey of a Gemini debuted and peaked at number 15 on the US Billboard 200 in the week of June 28, 2006, with first week sales of 49,000 units. It also debuted at number one on the Top R&B/Hip-Hop Albums chart, becoming Jones's first album to do so.

Track listing 

Notes
  signifies a co-producer
Sample credits
 "Cry" samples "Sara Smile" by Hall & Oates.
 "Feelin' You" samples "Experience" by Daedelus.
 "Can't Wait" contains a sample from "Masquerade" by Ab. 
 "Lust or Love" contains a portion of the composition entitled "Inside My Love" by Minnie Riperton.

Unreleased material 
In many interviews, Donell stated that he recorded 50 songs for the album. Some of those songs started to be leaked during the Summer/Fall period of 2004 due to Mixtape DJ's receiving those songs and putting them in their mixtapes. It was speculated that the album was pushed back numerous times due to the leaking of the songs onto the internet. But Donell stated, it was mainly because of the many complications of the Sony BMG merger that happened during the Spring of 2004. Donell was a bit heated at first when he heard about the leaking on the internet but then said it was sign to his fans that he was working on a new album.

"U Make Me Say" (Featuring Fat Joe) – 3:59
"You Didn't Love Me" – 3:58
"Do it All" – 2:26
"Marry Me" – 2:32
"Free" – 2:01
"Azzville" – 3:13
"September Love" – 4:06
"Bad Girl" – 2:58
"Sergeant Louise" – 3:54
"U Make Me Say" (Heya Remix) (Featuring Ja Rule) – 3:59

Charts

Weekly charts

Year-end charts

References

External links
[ Journey of a Gemini] at Allmusic

2006 albums
Albums produced by Sean Garrett
Albums produced by Jermaine Dupri
Albums produced by the Underdogs (production team)
Albums produced by Eddie F
Donell Jones albums
Albums produced by Ryan Leslie
Albums produced by Tim & Bob